The Dominica Association of Industry and Commerce (DAIC) is a Chamber of Commerce in the Dominica. It is responsible for the representation of private sector interests in Dominica.

Chambers of commerce
Organisations based in Dominica
1973 establishments in Dominica
Organizations established in 1973